I'm a Celebrity...Get Me Out of Here!, nicknamed I'm a Celebrity, is an international reality television franchise that originated in the United Kingdom.

The term can also refer to:

Television shows

 I'm a Celebrity...Get Me Out of Here! (British TV series), the original series
 I'm a Celebrity...Get Me Out of Here! (American TV series), the U.S. adaptation
 I'm a Celebrity...Get Me Out of Here! (Australian TV series), the Australian adaptation
 Ich bin ein Star – Holt mich hier raus!, the German adaptation

Music
 I'm a Celebrity (album), by Right Said Fred